This is a list of the cartoons in which Marvin the Martian appears. Mel Blanc provided the voice of Marvin until 1986. Chuck Jones directed every Marvin cartoon made until 1986.

1940s 
 Haredevil Hare (1948)

1950s 
 The Hasty Hare (1952)
 Duck Dodgers in the 24½th Century (1953)
 Hare-Way to the Stars (1958)

1960s 
 Mad as a Mars Hare (1963)

1980s 
 Duck Dodgers and the Return of the 24½th Century (1980) -
 Bugs Bunny's Bustin' Out All Over (1980)
 Spaced Out Bunny (1980) -
 Who Framed Roger Rabbit (1988) - (Movie) (Silent Cameo)

1990s 
 Bugs Bunny's Lunar Tunes (1991) - Joe Alaskey
 The Man from M.A.R.S. (1993) - Rob Paulsen
 Another Froggy Evening  (1995) - Joe Alaskey (Cameo)
 Superior Duck (1996) - Eric Goldberg (as Claude Raynes) (Cameo)
 Space Jam (Movie) (1996) - Bob Bergen
 Marvin the Martian in the Third Dimension (1997) - Joe Alaskey

2000s 
 Tweety's High-Flying Adventure (Movie) (2000) - Joe Alaskey (Cameo)
 War of the Weirds (Kid) (2003) - Samuel Vincent
 Duck Dodgers (TV Series) (2003) - Joe Alaskey
 Looney Tunes: Back in Action (Official Movie) (2003) - Eric Goldberg
 Bah, Humduck! A Looney Tunes Christmas (Holiday Movie) (2006) - Joe Alaskey

2010s 
 The Looney Tunes Show (TV Series) (2011) - Eric Bauza
 Looney Tunes: Rabbits Run (2015) - Damon Jones
 New Looney Tunes (TV Series) - Eric Bauza

2020s 
 Looney Tunes Cartoons (TV Series) (2020) -Eric Bauza
Space Jam: A New Legacy (Movie) (2021) - Eric Bauza

Cameos 
 Gravity, he appears as a toy version of the character

Lists of animated films by character
Lists of Looney Tunes cartoons